Kurla (Pronunciation: [kuɾlaː]) is a suburb of East Mumbai, India. It is the headquarters of the Kurla taluka of Mumbai Suburban district. The neighbourhood is named after the eponymous East Indian village that it grew out of. It falls under Zone 5, Ward 'L' of the Bombay Municipal Corporation. Its railway station, spelt as Coorla until 1890, is one of the busiest on the Mumbai suburban railway on the central and harbour railway lines of Mumbai as is the Lokmanya Tilak Terminus (LTT) for out-station passenger/express trains.

History 

Kurla gets its name from the East Indian village of Kurla, whose name, in turn, originated from "Kurli", the local name for crab, as these were found in plenty in marshes in the vicinity of the village.
The village of Kurla came under Portuguese rule when the Treaty of Bassein (1534) was signed by Sultan Bahadur of Gujarat and the Kingdom of Portugal on 23 December 1534. In 1548, the village of Kurla and six other villages were given by the Governor of  Portuguese India to Antonio Pessoa as a reward for his military services. Kurla remained under Portuguese rule until the British occupied Salsette Island in 1774. The island was formally ceded to the East India Company in the 1782 Treaty of Salbai.

In 1805, Kurla was connected to Sion on Bombay Island by the Sion Causeway. Coorla, as it was spelt during the British Raj until 1890, was a major station on the Great Indian Peninsula Railway between Bombay and Thane, the first railway line in British India when it opened in 1853.

In 1808, Kurla, along with the villages of Mohili, Kolekalyan, Marol, Sahar, Asalphe, and Parjapur, were given by the British to a Parsi merchant of Bombay, Mr. Hormasji Bamanji Wadia in exchange for a piece of land near the Apollo pier gate in Bombay. His Son, Mr. Ardeshir Hormasji Wadia, after whom the A. H. Wadia Road was named, paid for them a yearly Quit-rent of £358 (Rs. 3587).

Kurla had two cotton mills, one of them, the Dharamsi Punjabhai, being the largest cotton spinning and weaving mill in the Bombay Presidency, with 92,094 spindles and 1280 looms. The other was the Kurla Spinning and Weaving Mill. Kurla village had a population of 9,715 at that time. About half of them worked in the mills, while the rest were fishermen, husbandmen (farmers) and salt-makers. The Holy Cross Church at Kurla, built during the Portuguese rule and rebuilt in 1848, is one of the oldest churches in Mumbai.

The Mithibai Hormasji Wadia Dispensary was built by Mr. Bamanji Hormasji Wadia in 1855, and endowed by him with £1200 (Rs. 12,000). It was in charge of an assistant surgeon, and, in 1880–81, had an attendance of 7367 out-patients. There was also a considerable manufacture of shell lime. The Stone quarries of Kurla were well known and supplied material for the construction of most of the city's famous heritage buildings like the Prince of Wales Museum, and the General Post Office among others.

The beginning of the twentieth century saw Kurla develop as an important centre of the mill industry. In 1910, there were reported to be several mills in Kurla, engaged in the manufacturing of cotton cloth and woollen cloth in steam factories. Kurla, however, was an old textile industrial core, an outlier to the main cotton mill zone. A relatively cheaper land value and nearness to water and power mains enabled rapid industrial expansion of the suburbs and the Kurla-Ghatkopar–Vikhroli–Bhandup belt soon developed into the largest industrial zone in the suburbs of Mumbai.

The Central Railway began its Harbour Line services from Kurla to Reay Road station on 12 December 1910. This service was extended to Victoria Terminus in 1925. The Kurla Railway Car-shed was constructed in 1925 when electrification of the Great Indian Peninsula Railway (GIPR) Harbour line was undertaken. The first electric train in Asia that ran between CST and Coorla on 3 February 1925 was maintained at this car shed. The Salsette–Trombay Railway, also known as the Central Salsette Tramway, opened in 1928. The 13-kilometre line, a project of the Bombay Improvement Trust run by the GIPR, ran from Trombay to Andheri via Kurla and lasted only a few years.

Premier Automobiles built their first automobile assembly plant in Kurla in 1946 and began production in March 1947, collaborating with American automobile manufacturer Chrysler to manufacture Dodge, Plymouth and Desoto models in India. The iconic Premier Padmini car was also built at Kurla from 1964 until the plant closed down in 1997.
This resulted in the development of the old Kurla neighbourhood into an automobile industrial zone during the late fifties and sixties.

The Bombay Taximen Union began building the Taximen Colony close to the Mithi river in Kurla in 1969. It was inaugurated by union leader George Fernandes in 1972. The Bombay Taximen Cooperative housing society is Mumbai's second largest housing society.

The Dairy Development Department of the State Government, in order to cope-up with the increasing demand for milk, established a dairy at Nehru nagar, Kurla (East) in 1975.

Geography 

Kurla lies on the southern end of Salsette Island along the east bank of the Mithi River. Kurla may be divided into two parts: Kurla (East) and Kurla (West), separated by the Central Railway line. Kurla East is bordered by the suburban neighbourhoods of Chunabhatti in the south, Chembur in the East and Ghatkopar in the North. Kurla West is surrounded by Ghatkopar and Saki Naka neighbourhood of Andheri East to its North, Kalina and the Bandra Kurla Complex to its West and the Sion – Dharavi area to its south across the Mahim Creek. The Mithi River enters into Kurla's north-west corner near Sakinaka, running south along the Chhatrapati Shivaji International Airport boundary wall and the Bail Bazar locality, past the CST road and Taximen colony areas and empties into the Mahim Creek at the southern end of Kurla.

Administration 
Kurla is the headquarters of the Kurla taluka of Mumbai Suburban District. The taluka was carved out of South Salsette Taluka in 1920. It covers an area of 135 square kilometres, covering a total of 29 villages in two circles. This taluka occupies the east side of the district and is bordered by the Bandra taluka in the West, the Sanjay Gandhi National Park to the northwest, the Thane District in the north, the Thane Creek to the east, and Mumbai City district to the south.

The entire suburb falls under Zone 5, Ward 'L' of the Brihanmumbai Municipal Corporation. The Ward municipal offices are located in the Municipal market building on S. G.Barve Road. Residents of Kurla come under the Kurla (Vidhan Sabha constituency) (Number 174).  The number of electorates in 2009 was 284,951 (male 161,459, female 123,492).

Localities 
Kurla displays an urban blend of residential colonies, big and small, industrial estates commercial enclaves and slums. The L-Ward has the highest number of public open spaces subject to encroachment in the city with 80 of its 139 open spaces being encroached upon.

Old Kurla 

The earliest settlements in Kurla were in this area in the northern end of Kurla West. It consists of the Kurla Christian Village, an East Indian pocket of Christians who stem from Portuguese and Koli traditions, and the adjoining predominantly Christian Hall Village and Culbavour.

Kohinoor city 
Kohinoor city is an integrated township in Kurla west, comprising about 900,000 sq ft of commercial space and about 300,000 sq ft for retail, residential, hospitality and education. promoted by Kohinoor Group founded by Manohar Joshi. The site was formerly a motorcar manufacturing company called Premier Automobiles which used to manufacture its famous Padmini car here. The factory was closed and the Joshis bought 36-acres from Premier Automobiles in 2005. The neighbouring Premier residency buildings by HDIL and the Slum Rehabilitation Authority (SRA) buildings were built on land previously owned by Fiat Automobiles.

Transport 
Kurla is accessible from all parts of Mumbai by road and rail due to its central location.

Roads 

The Lal Bahadur Shastri Marg (formerly known as Old Agra Road) is the arterial road for Kurla West. The road begins at the southern end of Salsette Island, passing through Kurla and continuing up north into Ghatkopar towards Thane. The Andheri – Kurla road links Kurla with Andheri via Saki Naka, The road is notorious for its long traffic jams. while CST road (Central Salsette Tramway Road) leads to Santacruz. The Kurla Depot Junction is one of LBS marg's busiest junctions, with one arm proceeding towards the Western Express Highway and the other leading to the Santacruz-Chembur Link Road flyover.

The 6.45 kilometre long Santa Cruz – Chembur link road was opened in April 2014. It connects the east and west sides of Kurla via a Road over bridge (ROB) over the Central railway line, which is also the city's first double-decker flyover The road finally connects to the Eastern Express Highway at the Amar mahal junction. The Eastern Express Highway is the main thoroughfare for Kurla East. It runs from Sion Causeway in the south to Mulund in the North.

BEST buses travel from Kurla to all areas of Mumbai. The Kurla BEST Depot on the west suffered serious damage during the Mumbai floods of 2005 and has since been shut for redevelopment. Buses from this depot used to cater to Mumbai University (Kalina Campus), Bandra Kurla Complex and Chembur. Maharashtra State Road Transport Corporation buses ply from their depot at Nehru Nagar in the East to major towns in the State. Auto rickshaws and taxis are also available.

Railways 

Kurla railway station is a junction of the Central Railway Suburban line and the Harbour Line.

Lokmanya Tilak Terminus, formerly known as Kurla Terminus, is situated in the East. It was inaugurated in the 1980s and renovated in 2013. The Terminus handles several Central Railway Zone outstation trains every day.

Entertainment 
Mumbai's one of the largest malls, Phoenix Market City (Mumbai) is situated on L.B.S. Marg, Kurla (West).

Kurla has 3 multiscreen Cinema Halls housing: 
 8-screen PVR Cinema in Phoenix Market City, Phoenix Mall, L.B.S. Marg, Kurla (West)
 3-screen complex (Kamran, Kalpana and King's Talkies), L.B.S. Marg, Kurla (West) ( Now closed & converted into an Banquet Hall)
 2-screen Bharat Cineplex (previously known as Bharat Talkies), New Mill Road, Kurla (West)

And 2 single-screen Cinema Halls:
 Akash Talkies, Akash Talkies Lane, Kurla (West)
 Sheetal Talkies, L.B.S. Marg, Kurla (West) (closed & converted into an commercial and residential complex)
 New Model Talkies (now demolished).

Education 
Kurla has one engineering college, Don Bosco Institute of Technology, and several schools, including:-.

 Holy Cross High School
 Orchid International School, S.G. Barve Marg, Kurla (West)
 Kohinoor International School, Kirol Road, Kurla (West) 
 Shree Gujarati Samaj Vidyalaya, New Mill Road, Kurla (West) 
 Karthika High School & Junior College 
 St. Joseph High School
 Michael High School, Kurla
 Anjuman Islam High School, S.G. Barve Marg, Kurla (West)
 Mumbai Utkal English High School
 Swami Vivekananda Vidyalaya, Kurla (East)
 Vivek english high school (East)

Notable people 

 Iqbal Abdulla, Indian cricketer, playing in Royal Challengers Bangalore
 Shaikh Shamim Ahmed, MLA, Indian politician and Senior Congress leader
 Steven Dias, Indian football player (former resident)
 Erica Fernandes, model and actress
 Gurudas Kamat, politician and former member of parliament
 Navneet Kaur, actress (former resident) MP Amravati
 Kamran Khan, cricketer, former Pune Warriors player
 Sarfaraz Khan (cricketer), Royal Challengers Bangalore
 Nawab Malik, a former minister of Maharashtra, former MLA and a leader of the Nationalist Congress Party.
 Naezy, Rapper, Pioneer of Mumbai Hip-Hop scene. 
 Candice Pinto, model and Miss Tourism International 2002
 Balwinder Sandhu, Indian Test cricketer

Hospitals

Khan Bahadur Bhabha Hospital 
The Khan Bahadur Bhabha Municipal General Hospital, on Belgrami Road, near Bharat Cinema, is one of Mumbai's 16 peripheral hospitals run by the Brihanmumbai Municipal Corporation. It has more than 300 beds and provides secondary-level referral health care services. The hospital started off in 1935 as a 30-bed maternity home called Khan Bahadur Hospital. An outpatient department (OPD) was added in 1950, converting it into a general hospital. Several other departments like surgery and pediatrics were added from 1962 on.

Additionally, 'L' Ward has 9 municipal dispensaries, 12 municipal health posts and 67 privately run nursing homes and hospitals.

Other hospitals

 Arpan Nursing Home
 Aryan Hospital
 Central Hospital
 City Hospital and Research Center 
 Dr. Agashe's Maternity & Surgical Nursing Home
 Dr. Deshpande Nursing Home
 Dr. Mendadkars Children Hospital 
 Fauziya Hospital
 Fehmida Nursing Home
 Habib Hospital
 Infy Eye Care
 Islahi Day Care 
 K.B. Bhabha Hospital
 Kohinoor City Hospital
 Kurla Nursing Home
 Masoom Children Nursing Home
 Neelam Hospital
 Chota bhaba hospital kurla east BMC
 New Noor Hospital 
 Omkar Nursing Home
 Ram Agarwal Eye Hospital
 Roshan Multispeciality Hospital & ICU 
 Sai-Krupa Eye Clinic & Nursing Home
 Sheetal Nursing Home
 Sindhu Maternity & Nursing Home 
 Vardhaman Children Hospital
 Vcare Diagnostic

Places of worship 

 Church of Christ India - Thakkar Bappa Colony, Rajiv Gandhi Nagar, Kurla (East) 
 Markaz Masjid – Pipe Road
 Mehboob-E-Subhani Masjid, New Mill Road, Kurla (West)
 Shri Adishwar Jain Temple, New Mill Road, Kurla (West)
 Shri Munisuvrat Swami Jain Temple, New Mill Road, Kurla (West)
 Shri Labdhidayak Shantinath Jain Temple, Takiya Ward, Kurla (West) 
 Sarveshwar Mandir, Takiya Ward, Kurla (West)
 Shri Chandraprabh Swami Jain Temple, S.G. Barve Marg, Kurla (East) 
 Shri Ambe Mata Temple, Near Kurla Garden, Kurla (West)
 Hari Masjid – Kurla Garden
 Shri Balaji Temple, Pipe Road, Kurla (West)
 Markaz Masjid – Pipe Road
 Habibiya masjid kurla East quresh nagar (EAST)
Badi Masjid Kurla east quresh nagar(East)
 Church of Christ, Kurla – Telugu Baptist Church, L.B.S. Marg, Kurla (West) court
 Holy Cross Church, Premier Road

References

See also 

 Mumbai Suburban District
 Kurla Terminus
 Kurla railway station

Talukas in Maharashtra
Suburbs of Mumbai